Chloe Cathryn Ainsworth (born 14 September 2005) is an Australian cricketer who currently plays for Western Australia in the Women's National Cricket League (WNCL). She plays as a right-arm medium bowler.

Domestic career
In December 2022, Ainsworth played for Western Australia in the Cricket Australia Under-19 National Female Championships, scoring one half-century and taking 10 wickets. On 21 December 2022, Ainsworth made her debut for Western Australia's senior team, bowling four overs.

Ainsworth plays grade cricket for Melville Cricket Club.

International career
In December 2022, Ainsworth was named in the Australia Under-19 squad for the 2023 ICC Under-19 Women's T20 World Cup. She played one match at the tournament, taking two wickets, before being forced to withdraw due to injury.

References

External links

2005 births
Living people
Place of birth missing (living people)
Australian women cricketers
Western Australia women cricketers